Borculo is a city in the eastern Netherlands, in the municipality of Berkelland, Gelderland. Borculo was an independent municipality until 2005, when it merged with Eibergen, Neede, and Ruurlo. Other population centers in the municipality of Borculo were nearby Geesteren, Gelselaar, and Haarlo.

History

Borculo began as a settlement near where, at the time, the Berkel joined a smaller stream called the Grolse Slinge. In the 12th century a castle called Hof van Borculo was built. A defensive wall  surrounding the village was constructed in 1348. The village received city rights in 1375. The city wall has been demolished, but parts of the defensive moat, which was also used as a trading route over the Berkel to the cities along the Berkel (such as Zutphen), can still be found in Borculo.

Borculo was then ruled by the counts of Limburg and Bronkhorst. In the long conflict (known as the "Borculo question") between the heirs of the last count of Bronkhorst (deceased in 1553 without children) and the Prince-Bishop of Munster over ownership of Borculo, the Court of Gelderland ruled on 20 December 1615 in favour of count Joost of Limburg and Bronkhorst. The ruling was imposed by troops from Zutphen, taking over the castle and city of Lichtenvoorde in December 1615, and the castle and city of Borculo in February 1616 after short combat. Prince-Bishop Christoph Bernhard von Galen tried twice to keep Borculo under Munster's authority, but without success. Thereafter, Borculo definitively belonged to the province of Guelders instead of Munster.

In 1777 the region came into the possession of Stadtholder William V, after which the castle was demolished and rebuilt. Most of the castle was demolished in 1869–1870, but parts of the keep still exist. These parts are hidden below the library and cultural centre, although they were visible to the public for several years. Due to wear, these parts were buried again. The King of the Netherlands is still Lord of Borculo.

Borculo is probably known best for the tornado that destroyed much of the village on 10 August 1925. Tornadoes that are this disastrous are very rare in the Netherlands.

Gallery

References

External links
Official Website

Municipalities of the Netherlands disestablished in 2005
Former municipalities of Gelderland
Populated places in Gelderland
Berkelland